Tymoteusz Puchacz (born 23 January 1999) is a Polish professional footballer who plays as a left-back for Greek Super League club Panathinaikos, on loan from Bundesliga side Union Berlin, and the Poland national team.

Club career
Puchacz started his career with Lech Poznań.

On 15 December 2017, he was loaned to I liga side Zagłębie Sosnowiec.

On 31 August 2018, he was loaned to I liga side GKS Katowice.

On 18 May 2021, Union Berlin signed Puchacz with a transfer fee of €3.5 million. He joined the club for the 2021–22 season.

On 10 January 2022, he was loaned to Süper Lig side Trabzonspor.

On 29 December 2022, his loan to Super League Greece side Panathinaikos was confirmed.

International career
Puchacz made his debut for Poland national team on 1 June 2021 in a friendly against Russia.

Career statistics

Club

1 Including Polish Super Cup.

International

Honours
Trabzonspor
 Süper Lig: 2021–22

References

External links

 
 
 

1999 births
Living people
People from Sulechów
Polish footballers
Association football defenders
Poland international footballers
Poland youth international footballers
Poland under-21 international footballers
UEFA Euro 2020 players
Ekstraklasa players
I liga players
Bundesliga players
Süper Lig players
Super League Greece players
Lech Poznań II players
Lech Poznań players
Zagłębie Sosnowiec players
GKS Katowice players
1. FC Union Berlin players
Trabzonspor footballers
Panathinaikos F.C. players
Polish expatriate footballers
Polish expatriate sportspeople in Germany
Expatriate footballers in Germany
Polish expatriate sportspeople in Turkey
Expatriate footballers in Turkey
Polish expatriate sportspeople in Greece
Expatriate footballers in Greece